Edward Stransham (c. 1557 at Oxford – executed 21 January 1586, at Tyburn) was an English Roman Catholic priest. He is a Catholic martyr, beatified in 1929.

Life
Edward Stransham was born at Oxford around 1557. He was educated at St John's College, Oxford, becoming B.A. in 1575-6. He arrived at Douai College in 1577, and went with the college to Reims in 1578, but returned to England due to illness.

In 1579, however, he returned to Reims with four potential students, and was ordained priest at Soissons in December 1580. Although ill he left for England 30 June 1581, as it was thought his native air might do him good. With him went fellow priest Nicholas Woodfen, of the London Diocese, ordained priest at Reims, 25 March 1581.

In 1583 Stransham came back to Reims with ten Oxford converts. After five months there he went to Paris, where he remained about eighteen months at death's door from consumption.

He was arrested in Bishopsgate Street Without, London, 17 July 1585, while saying Mass, and was condemned at the next assizes for being a priest.

He was hanged, drawn and quartered at Tyburn.  His beatification took place in 1929, under Pope Pius XI.

See also
 Catholic Church in the United Kingdom
 Douai Martyrs

References

Attribution
  The entry cites:
Wainewright in Downside Review (1911)

1554 births
1586 deaths
English beatified people
16th-century venerated Christians
16th-century English Roman Catholic priests
People from Oxford
One Hundred and Seven Martyrs of England and Wales